Line Creek may refer to:

Streams
in the United States
Line Creek (Flint River tributary), a stream in Georgia
Line Creek (Missouri), a stream in Platte County, Missouri
Line Creek (Grass River), a stream in New York
Line Creek (Schoharie Creek tributary), New York
Line Creek (Deep River tributary), a stream in Chatham County, North Carolina
Line Creek (South Dakota), a stream in Perkins County, South Dakota